Gerhard Wächter (11 August 1946 – 19 February 2022) was a German politician. A member of the Christian Democratic Union of Germany, he served in the Bundestag from 2002 to 2009. He died on 19 February 2022, at the age of 75.

References

1946 births
2022 deaths
20th-century German politicians
21st-century German politicians
Members of the Bundestag 2002–2005
Members of the Bundestag 2005–2009
Members of the Landtag of North Rhine-Westphalia
Christian Democratic Union of Germany politicians
University of Münster alumni
People from Paderborn (district)